Blessed Ortolana of Assisi (sometimes spelled Hortulana, born in the 12th century – died before 1238 in Assisi) – blessed of the Catholic Church. The nun of The Order of Saint Clare (Poor Clares). Wife of Favarone Offreduccio, mother of Saint Clare of Assisi and Saint Agnes of Assisi. She joined The Monastery of San Damiano after her husband's death.

References

13th-century Christian saints
Christian female saints of the Middle Ages
13th-century Italian Roman Catholic religious sisters and nuns